Poshtkuh Rural District is in Bushkan District of Dashtestan County, Bushehr province, Iran. At the census of 2006, its population was 5,896 in 1,325 households; there were 5,570 inhabitants in 1,465 households at the following census of 2011; and in the most recent census of 2016, the population of the rural district was 5,911 in 1,757 households. The largest of its 15 villages was Talheh, with 2,433 people.

References 

Rural Districts of Bushehr Province
Populated places in Dashtestan County